Agogo Eewo (English: Taboo Gong) is a 2002 Yoruba-language film and sequel to the 1999 film, Saworoide. It was written by Akunwunmi Isola And produced and directed by Tunde Kelani. It stars Dejumo Lewis, Deola Faleye, Lere Paimo and Larinde Akinleye.

Plot 
Following the death of Lapite and Lagata, the Jogbo chiefs attempt to put an Onijogbo (king) of their choosing on the throne in order to be able to continue their corrupt practices. They pick a retired police officer named Adebosipo whom they thought will be in their favour. On ascending the throne, Adebosipo turns a new leaf and decides to move on from corrupt ways and advocates for peace and progress in the community. He admonishes his chiefs to depart from their old ways. Balogun, Seriki, Bada and Iyalaje continue their corrupt practices. The town youth kicked against the presence of corrupt chiefs on Adebosipo's cabinet and call for their removal. The king sets up a committee to audit the activities of the chiefs. Those found guilty were compelled to return the funds looted by them. The king summons the Ifa priest, Amawomárò who recommends the reinstatement of an oath-taking ritual to ensure the moral upstanding of the chiefs. A public oath-taking ceremony is organised and where the chiefs were to confess their past misdeeds before swearing the oath. Two chiefs, Balogun and Seriki refused and died on the spot when the agogo eewo (taboo gong) was struck seven times.

Cast 

 Dejumo Lewis as Adebosipo
Kunle Afolayan
Khabirat Kafidipe
 Deola Faleye 
 Lere Paimo
 Larinde Akinleye

Production and release 
It was listed as one of the 10 best selling Yoruba movies. It was classified as Not To Be Broadcast (NTBB) by the Nigerian Film and Video Censors Board (NFVCB) citing the demonstration of occult practices, violence and seduction.

It was reviewed at the African Film Festival in New York in April 2004.

Themes 
Like Saworoide, Agogo Eewo explores the themes of politics and corruption and juxtaposes Nigeria as the fictional town of Jogbo. It also introduces the viewer to Yoruba culture and fashion as some scenes delicately explain types of gele.

References

External links 

Yoruba-language films
2002 films
Nigerian drama films
Political films
Films directed by Tunde Kelani